Rahkla is a village in Sõmeru Parish, Lääne-Viru County, in northeastern Estonia.

Before the administrative reform of Estonian local governments in 2017, the village belonged to Sõmeru rural municipality .

Its EHAK (Eesti haldus- ja asustusjaotuse klassifikaator) code is 6726.

References

This article includes text translated from the corresponding article in the Estonian Wikipedia.

Villages in Lääne-Viru County